Nivea is a brand of cosmetics.

It may also refer to:
 Nivea (given name)
 Nivea (singer) (born 1982), American R&B singer Nivea B. Hamilton
 Nivea (album), her 2001 debut album
 Mount Nivea, South Orkney Islands

See also 
 niveum